Vachellia flava, synonym Acacia ehrenbergiana, is a species of drought-resistant bush or small tree, commonly known as salam in Arabic. It is found in the Sahara, the northern Sahel, parts of East Africa, the Arabian Peninsula and Iran.

Description
Vachellia flava is a tall shrub or small tree, seldom exceeding  in height. It is much branched, the trunk has dark brown, shaggy bark and the branches are green or brown with shiny, peeling bark. The compound leaves are small, with up to four pairs of pinnae, each with eight to twelve pairs of pinnules. The seeds pods are flattened and curved with constrictions between the seeds. This shrub resembles the red acacia (Vachellia seyal) but that species lives in habitats with higher precipitation and has thorns that are shorter than its leaves. It also resembles Vachellia hockii but that species has leaves that usually have only one or two pinnae.

Distribution and habitat
Vachellia flava is native to the central and southern Sahara and the northern part of the Sahel but is uncommon in the western Sahara. It also occurs in East Africa and Arabia. It is typically found growing in shallow depressions and gullies, positions where water can be expected to seep into the ground on the rare occasions when rain falls. The IUCN Red List of Threatened Species lists the plant as being of "Least Concern" as it is common across its large range, the population is stable and it is often the dominant vegetation type in the areas in which it grows. Nevertheless, it is important that it is not over-exploited because of its importance to indigenous people.

Uses
The foliage of Vachellia flava is used for livestock feed and the trees are sometimes pollarded for this purpose. It is an important fodder plant for camels, goats and sheep and the flowers are visited by bees which make "acacia honey" from the nectar. The timber is used for charcoal and firewood, the bark for fibre to be wound into ropes, and the sap produces a low quality gum which oozes from damaged parts of the trunk. An ointment is made from the plant's ground up tissues.

References

External links
 

flava
Flora of the Arabian Peninsula
Flora of East Tropical Africa
Flora of Iran
Flora of North Africa
Flora of Northeast Tropical Africa
Flora of West Tropical Africa
Sahel
Taxobox binomials not recognized by IUCN